ELWa was an Assembly Sponsored Public Body responsible for post-16 learning in Wales, active from 2000 to 2006. ELWa's functions are now exercised by the Assembly Government's Department for Children, Education, Lifelong Learning and Skills.

Formation and activities

ELWa - Education and Learning Wales was the brand used by the National Council for Education and Training for Wales (NCETW), an Assembly Sponsored Public Body (ASPB) or quango established by the Learning and Skills Act 2000.  NCETW merged the functions of the former training and enterprise councils in Wales with the Further Education Funding Council for Wales. The organisation's remit was to plan and fund post-16 learning (excluding higher education) in Wales, including further education, publicly funded work-based training, adult community learning and school sixth forms.

NCETW/ELWa's main statutory responsibilities were to:
 Secure the provision of facilities for post-16 education and training in Wales (with the exception of higher education (covered by the other ELWa partner, Higher Education Funding Council for Wales);
 Encourage young people and adults to participate in learning; and
 Encourage employers to participate in, and contribute to the costs of, post-16 education and training.

The Welsh Assembly Government treated ELWa as a single entity although it was not constituted as one.

Re-organisation

Initially the ELWa brand was used by both the NCETW and the Higher Education Funding Council for Wales (HEFCW), and both organisations shared a common executive with some joint staff co-located in Llanishen (NCETW also maintained the former TEC offices in Bedwas, Swansea, Newtown and St Asaph). Following a review in 2002 the Welsh Minister for Education and Lifelong Learning, Jane Davidson, decided that each Council should have a full-time dedicated Chief Executive and Director of Finance. Around the same time it also became apparent that there was no legal basis for the two Councils to jointly employ staff. Subsequently the brand name ELWa was retained solely by NCETW.

Criticism

During its short history, ELWa attracted criticism for a series of failures in financial management, poor risk management and organisational restructuring.

Merger with Welsh Assembly Government

ELWa was merged with the Welsh Assembly Government on 1 April 2006, along with the Welsh Development Agency and Wales Tourist Board. ELWa's functions are now exercised by the Welsh Government's Department for  Education and Skills (DfES).

References

Welsh Government
Education in Wales
Welsh Government sponsored bodies
Defunct public bodies of the United Kingdom